The 1986 IIHF European U18 Championship''' was the nineteenth playing of the IIHF European Junior Championships.

Group A
Played from April 3–9, in Düsseldorf, Ratingen, and Krefeld, West Germany.  On the final day of the tournament, the Soviets played to a four all draw with the Swedes, leaving them in fourth place, out of the medals.  In the twenty-four years that the Soviets played at the European Juniors (1968 to 1991), this is one and only time they finished out of the medals.

 First round 
Group 1

Group 2

Final round
Championship round

Placing roundRomania was relegated to Group B for 1987.Tournament Awards
Top Scorer  Tero Toivola (17 points)
Top Goalie: Radek Tóth
Top Defenceman:Kari Harila
Top Forward: Morgan Samuelsson

Group B
Played from March 16 to 22, 1986, in Aoste Italy.

 First round
Group 1

Group 2

Final round 
Championship round

Placing roundPoland was promoted to Group A and the Netherlands were relegated to Group C, for 1987.Group C
Played December 28 to January 2, in Barcelona Spain.Great Britain was promoted to Group B for 1987.''

References

Complete results

Junior
IIHF European Junior Championship tournament
1986
1986
Euro
Sport in Krefeld
April 1986 sports events in Europe
Sports competitions in Düsseldorf
March 1986 sports events in Europe
Euro
December 1985 sports events in Europe
January 1986 sports events in Europe
1985 in Catalonia
1986 in Catalonia
International ice hockey competitions hosted by Spain
Sports competitions in Barcelona
1980s in Barcelona
Euro
1980s in Düsseldorf